The Kyushu Railway History Museum is a railway museum owned by JR Kyushu in Kitakyushu, Japan.

History
The museum's main building was the former head office of Kyushu Railway which was constructed doing 1891. In 2003 the Kyushu Railway Company opened the museum with many trains from all around Kyushu. In 2014 the main building was inscribed as a Tangible Cultural Property of Japan.

Exhibits 
The museum consists of three areas: the main building, the vehicle exhibition hall and a mini railway park. It is much smaller than other Japanese railway museums like the SCMaglev and Railway Park in Nagoya or the Kyoto Railway Museum.

References 

Railway museums in Japan
Museums established in 2003
2003 establishments in Japan
Buildings and structures in Kitakyushu
Museums in Fukuoka Prefecture
Kyushu Railway Company